Enrique Figuerola Camue (born July 15, 1938) is a retired sprinter from Cuba.

His major international success was his threefold participation in the Olympic Games. He made his first appearance at the 1960 Summer Olympics in Rome, where he finished fourth in the 100 m final. Four years later, at the 1964 Summer Olympics in Tokyo, Figuerola won the silver medal in the 100 m, behind American Robert Hayes (gold) and ahead of Canadian Harry Jerome (bronze). At the 1968 Summer Olympics in Mexico he won another silver medal, in the 4 × 100 m relay this time, together with his teammates Hermes Ramirez, Juan Morales and Pablo Montes, behind the US team (gold) and ahead of France (bronze).

References

1938 births
Living people
Sportspeople from Santiago de Cuba
Cuban male sprinters
Olympic male sprinters
Olympic athletes of Cuba
Olympic silver medalists for Cuba
Olympic silver medalists in athletics (track and field)
Athletes (track and field) at the 1960 Summer Olympics
Athletes (track and field) at the 1964 Summer Olympics
Athletes (track and field) at the 1968 Summer Olympics
Medalists at the 1964 Summer Olympics
Medalists at the 1968 Summer Olympics
Pan American Games gold medalists for Cuba
Pan American Games medalists in athletics (track and field)
Athletes (track and field) at the 1959 Pan American Games
Athletes (track and field) at the 1963 Pan American Games
Central American and Caribbean Games gold medalists for Cuba
Central American and Caribbean Games medalists in athletics
Competitors at the 1966 Central American and Caribbean Games
Universiade gold medalists for Cuba
Universiade medalists in athletics (track and field)
Medalists at the 1961 Summer Universiade
Medalists at the 1963 Summer Universiade
Japan Championships in Athletics winners
Medalists at the 1959 Pan American Games
Medalists at the 1963 Pan American Games
20th-century Cuban people